GKA may refer to:

 Goa Konkani Akademi, Goa, India
 Goroka Airport, Goroka, Papua New Guinea
 Gunma Kokusai Academy, Japan
 Guya language
 Portishead Radio, a defunct English radio station